Baldur Preiml (born 8 July 1939, in Bruggen) is an Austrian former ski jumper who competed from 1960 to 1968.

His best-known finish was a Bronze medal in the Individual Normal Hill at the 1968 Winter Olympics in Grenoble.

External links
 
 

1939 births
Living people
Austrian male ski jumpers
Olympic ski jumpers of Austria
Olympic bronze medalists for Austria
Ski jumpers at the 1964 Winter Olympics
Ski jumpers at the 1968 Winter Olympics
Olympic medalists in ski jumping
Medalists at the 1968 Winter Olympics
Universiade medalists in ski jumping
People from Spittal an der Drau District
Universiade gold medalists for Austria
Competitors at the 1964 Winter Universiade
Sportspeople from Carinthia (state)
20th-century Austrian people